Perkalaba is a Ukrainian band from Ivano-Frankivsk playing music combining elements of hutsul-folk, ska and punk rock.

Compared to artists like Goran Bregović or Zabranjeno pušenje.

Named after a tiny Hutzul-village in the Carpathian mountains, which is their musical Zion, they mix all kinds of music of the Ukrainian regions with punk and ska-elements to an energetic Hutzul-Ethno-Ska. It's their freaky show, the charismatic singer and their joy of playing what fascinates the audience even at extended two and a half hours gigs. Moreover, the band is always full of nonsense, so spontaneous unplugged sessions at all imaginable places are one of their peculiarities

Perkalaba started their career in 1998 in Ivano-Frankivsk (west Ukraine) and at first played ska punk with slight roots reggae influences in local underground clubs. Later the band turned more towards their roots - Hutzul-music.
Initially they toured across the Ukraine and then played several gigs in Poland, Russia, Germany, Austria, Switzerland, Holland.

They were finally discovered at the "Rock Existenzia Festival" in Kyiv where the amazed audience realized that they were facing a true gem, that was fooling around with the audience. At the "orange revolution" Perkalaba were also a mainspring and the band was facing their new future.
Nowadays the band is popular in the Ukraine, Poland and on Folk-Rock festivals all over the world.

The music of Perkalaba is inspired by various ethnic music from around the world, especially from various regions of Ukraine, such as Hutzul, Northern Bukovina and Zakarpattya. Other influences include the punk music of the Pogues' Shane MacGowan, Element of Crime and as well as from reggae music, which includes such bands and artists as Bob Marley, Manu Chao, Skatalites. Now Perkalaba plays in a Balkan beat style mixed with Hutzul roots.

In 2011 they recorded a new album  titled "Dido" (Grandfather). One of the songs features Eugene Hutz of Gogol Bordello fame, who is a big fan and friend of Perkalaba. The title of the song is Didoborodaty-2011.
The album  was presented on December 1, 2011 at the Sullivan Room Kyiv, Ukraine.

Ruslana Khazipova of Perkalaba takes part in the Dakh Daughters project.

Discography 
 2005 - Горрри! / Horrry! 
 2006 - Qzzaargh vs Perkalaba 
 2007 - Горрри! (перевидання) / Horrry! (re-issue) 
 2007 - Говорить Івано-Франківськ / Hovoryt Ivano-Frankivsk 
 2011 - Dido 
 2013 - Джєрґа / Djerga

References 

Ukrainian musical groups